Fas-activated serine/threonine kinase is an enzyme that in humans is encoded by the FASTK gene.

The protein encoded by this gene is a member of the serine/threonine protein kinase family. This kinase was shown to be activated rapidly during Fas-mediated apoptosis in Jurkat cells. In response to Fas receptor ligation, it phosphorylates the apoptosis-promoting nuclear RNA-binding protein TIA1. The encoded protein is a strong inducer of lymphocyte apoptosis. Two transcript variants encoding different isoforms have been found for this gene. Other variants exist, but their full-length natures have not yet been determined.

References

Further reading

EC 2.7.11